Retinella is a genus of air-breathing land snails, terrestrial pulmonate gastropod mollusks in the family Gastrodontidae.

Species
Species within the genus Retinella include:
 Retinella actinophora (Dall, 1900)
 † Retinella applanata Kókay, 2006 
 Retinella circumsessa (Shuttleworth, 1852)
 † Retinella depressissima (Sacco, 1884) 
 † Retinella elephantium (Bourguignat, 1869) 
 † Retinella forcarti Schlickum & Strauch, 1979 
 Retinella giustii A. Riedel, 1998
 Retinella hierroensis M. R. Alonso & Ibáñez, 2013
 Retinella hiulca (Albers, 1850)
 Retinella incerta (Draparnaud, 1805)
 Retinella lenis (Shuttleworth, 1852)
 Retinella olivetorum (Gmelin, 1791)
 Retinella osoriensis (Wollaston, 1878)
 Retinella radiatella (Reinhardt, 1877)
 Retinella rochebruni (J. Mabille, 1882)
 Retinella (Retinelloides) stabilei (Pollonera, 1886) (uncertain)
Synonyms
 Retinella chathamensis (Dall, 1893): synonym of Glyphyalus chathamensis (Dall, 1893) (unaccepted combination)
 Retinella cypria (L. Pfeiffer, 1847): synonym of Schistophallus cyprius (L. Pfeiffer, 1847): synonym of Oxychilus cyprius (L. Pfeiffer, 1847) (unaccepted combination)
 Retinella graziadei Boeckel, 1940: synonym of Aegopinella graziadei (Boeckel, 1940) (original combination)
 Retinella insecta (E. von Martens, 1877): synonym of Glyphyalinia insecta (E. von Martens, 1877) (unaccepted combination)
 Retinella kobelti Lindholm, 1910: synonym of Schistophallus kobelti (Lindholm, 1910) (original combination)
 Retinella mavromoustakisi F. Haas, 1934: synonym of Oxychilus mavromoustakisi (F. Haas, 1934) (original combination)
 Retinella radiatula (Alder, 1830): synonym of Perpolita hammonis (Strøm, 1765) (junior synonym)
 Retinella subhyalina (L. Pfeiffer, 1867): synonym of Nesovitrea subhyalina (L. Pfeiffer, 1867) (unaccepted combination)
 Retinella zikmundi Branson, 1964: synonym of Glyphyalinia wheatleyi (Bland, 1883)

References

 Riedel, A. (1977). Materialen zur Kenntnis der Zonitidae (Gastropoda). IX–XI. Annales Zoologici, 33 (24): 495-515. Warszawa.
 Bank, R. A. (2017). Classification of the Recent terrestrial Gastropoda of the World. Last update: July 16th, 2017

 
Gastropod genera